The Edgemont School District is a public school district in Fall River County, based in Edgemont, South Dakota.

Schools
The Edgemont School District has one elementary school and one high school.

Elementary school
Edgemont Elementary School

Middle school
Edgemont Middle School

High school
Edgemont High School

References

External links

School districts in South Dakota